is a Japanese professional footballer who plays as a centre-back or full-back for Premier League club Arsenal and the Japan national team.

Beginning his career at Avispa Fukuoka, Tomiyasu had a spell with Belgian club Sint-Truiden and Italian club Bologna before joining Arsenal in 2021. He was also called up for Japan's senior team in 2018, having previously played for various youth levels.

Club career

Avispa Fukuoka
Born in Fukuoka, Japan, Tomiyasu was first scouted by the Sanchiku Kickers’ general manager Kanji Tsuji, who was impressed with his performance, especially his speed. Following this, Tsuji convinced his parents to let him play football, which led Tomiyasu to be enrolled at Sanchiku Elementary School. When he was eleven, Tomiyasu was recommended for a trial at FC Barcelona Soccer Camp by his coach. He impressed at the trial so FC Barcelona offered him a place on the club's youth academy, but it was difficult for him to relocate to Spain and the move was cancelled. Despite this, Tomiyasu said the experience at the Soccer Camp was "inspiring".

After failing to join FC Barcelona, Tomiyasu joined Avispa Fukuoka. Initially playing in the midfield position, he switched to a centre-back position. During his time at Avispa Fukuoka's youth system, Tomiyasu had a period as the club captain. He impressed at the 2013's JFA Premier Cup, and was named in the Best Eleven as a result. In May 2015, it was announced that Avispa Fukuoka had registered Tomiyasu. After appearing in two matches as an unused substitute, he made his debut for the club on 14 October 2015 as a starter in a 2–0 loss against Machida Zelvia in the third round of the Emperor's Cup. At the end of the 2015 season, Tomiyasu signed a temporary contract with Avispa Fukuoka.

At the start of the 2016 season, Tomiyasu spent the first half of the J League season on the substitute bench. Tomiyasu made his first appearance of the season on 20 April 2016, as a starter in the defensive midfield position, in a 0–0 draw against Vegalta Sendai in the J League Cup. However, in the J. League Cup match against Sagan Tosu, Tomiyasu was sent off for a second bookable offence in a 1–1 draw. Two months later, on 13 July 2016, he made his league debut for the club, starting in the defensive midfield position in a 2–1 win against FC Tokyo. After making his debut for the club, Tomiyasu became a first team regular for the side, usually playing in the defensive midfield position. It was reported on 26 September 2016 that he had become the second player in the league to be the fastest player at 12.436 km in. Following the club's relegation to J. League 2, Tomiyasu went on to make sixteen appearances in all competitions. At the end of the 2016 season, Tomiyasu had his contract with the club renewed.

In the 2017 season, Tomiyasu became a first team regular for the side, playing in the centre-back position. He then scored his first goal for the club, in a 2–1 win against Roasso Kumamoto on 19 March 2017. Despite being absent from the first team, due to international commitment, Tomiyasu continued to regain his first team place for the club for the rest of the season. He then helped Avispa Fukuoka three clean sheets in three matches between 29 July 2017 and 11 August 2017. Tomiyasu later helped the club qualify for the J1 League Promotion Playoffs, having finished fourth place in the league. He helped the side beat Tokyo Verdy 1–0 to reach the semi–finals of the J1 League Promotion Playoffs. In the final of the J1 League Promotion Playoffs against Nagoya Grampus, Tomiyasu played 90 minutes, as they drew 0–0 but saw Avispa Fukuoka unsuccessfully promoted to J. League One. At the end of the 2017 season, Tomiyasu went on to make thirty–nine appearances and scoring once in all competitions.

Sint-Truidense
It was announced on 8 January 2018 that Tomiyasu would be moving abroad for the first time in his career by joining Belgian First Division A side Sint-Truiden. He signed a three and a half year contract with the club, keeping him until 2021. Upon joining the club, Tomiyasu said: "I want to become a special player in Belgium." After spending months at training and recovering from an ankle injury, Tomiyasu made his Sint-Truiden debut for the club, coming on as a late substitute, in a 2–1 win against Royal Antwerp on 12 May 2018. This turned out to be his only appearance of the 2017–18 season.

In the 2018–19 season, Tomiyasu made his first start for Sint-Truiden and played the entirety of a 0–0 draw against Cercle Brugge in the opening game of the season. Since the start of the season, he became a first team regular for the side, playing in the centre-back position. Between 23 September 2018 and 30 September 2018, Tomiyasu kept three consecutive clean sheets in three matches. Having spent in the centre-back position since the start of the season, he played in the right–back position, which came against Zulte Waregem on 4 November 2018. Tomiyasu scored his first goal of the season on 25 November 2018 in a 4–2 win against Anderlecht. After spending January on international duty with Japan, Tomiyasu returned to Sint-Truidense on 9 February 2019, starting and playing the full 90 minutes in a 2–1 win against Waasland-Beveren. He continued to regain his first team for the side for the rest of the 2018–19 season. His performance received praise from the Belgian media. As a result, he won the club's Player of the Year. In his second season at Sint-Truidense, Tomiyasu made 40 appearances and scored once in all competitions.

Bologna

It was reported on 29 June 2019 that Bologna agreed a €9 million deal to sign Tomiyasu. The transfer move was confirmed on 9 July 2019 and Tomiyasu became the second Japanese player to join the club after Hidetoshi Nakata. Upon joining the club, he said: "Impression that the defensive tactics are detailed. The striker level is also very high. I chose this team because I wanted to learn individual defense tactics. First I wanted to be on the pitch."

Tomiyasu made his Bologna debut, playing the whole game, in a 3–0 win against Pisa in the first round of the Coppa Italia. A week later, he made his league debut, playing the full 90 minutes of a 1–1 draw against Hellas Verona, and was named Man of the Match for his performance. Having made three appearances, he was named August's Player of the Month. He started in the first league seven matches before suffering a hamstring injury in October that kept him out for a month. On 24 November, he made his return to the starting lineup in a 2–2 draw against Parma. Since joining the club, Tomiyasu quickly established himself in the starting eleven playing at right-back, and his performances impressed the Italian media and supporters alike. By the time the season was suspended because of the COVID-19 pandemic, he had made 20 appearances in all competitions. Tomiyasu remained an integral part of the club once the season resumed behind closed doors. He scored his first goal for Bologna in the 44th minute with his left foot, in a 5–1 loss against Milan on 18 July 2020. In a follow–up match against Atalanta, Tomiyasu suffered a hamstring injury and was substituted in the 74th minute, as the club lost 1–0. After the match, it was announced that he would be sidelined for the rest of the 2019–20 season. Despite this, Tomiyasu finished his first season at Bologna, making 30 appearances and scoring once in all competitions.

Ahead of the 2020–21 season, Tomiyasu's performances last season led to suggestions that he could be playing in the centre–back position. Tomiyasu soon recovered from his injury and regained his first team place, playing in the centre-back position. In a match against Sassuolo on 18 October 2020, he scored an own goal after a cross from Giorgos Kyriakopoulos, leading to the winning goal for the opposition team. In December, Tomiyasu began playing as right-back for the rest of the season, though he occasionally played as a left-back and centre-back. This was due to his struggles playing as centre-back, resulting in criticism by the Italian media. His performances began to improve as a result of the tactical change. Tomiyasu  scored his first goal of the season in a 2–2 draw against Atalanta on 23 December. Two weeks later on 6 January 2021, he scored his second goal of the season, scoring from a header, in a 2–2 draw against Udinese. However, Tomiyasu suffered a calf injury that saw him out for two weeks. He made his return to the starting line–up two weeks later than expected on 14 March against Sampdoria, starting in a 3–1 win. His return was short–lived when he suffered a muscular problem against Inter Milan on 4 April. After being sidelined for a month, he made his return to the starting line–up on 2 May against Fiorentina and played 76 minutes before being substituted, in a 3–3 draw. By the end of the season, he had made 33 appearances and scoring two times in all competitions.

Ahead of the 2021–22 season, Tomiyasu was linked with a move to Premier League club Tottenham Hotspur and Atalanta. Amid the transfer speculation, he made his only appearance of the season against Atalanta, coming on as an 81st-minute substitute, in a 0–0 draw on 28 August 2021.

Arsenal
On 31 August 2021, Tomiyasu joined Premier League side Arsenal on a four-year deal, with an option for a fifth. The transfer was variously reported as £15.5million, £16 million and £17 million. Upon joining the club, both manager Mikel Arteta and technical director Edu commented about the player, describing him as an "important member of the squad" at Arsenal. On 11 September, he made his first appearance for Arsenal against Norwich City in a 1–0 win. Tomiyasu was named Arsenal's Player of the Month for September 2021, with 51% of the vote.

International career

Youth

Having previously played for Japan U14 and Japan U15, Tomiyasu was called up to the Japan U16 for the first time in March 2013 ahead of the Montaigu Tournament. He participated in the tournament, as the U16 side finished seventh place. In August 2014, Tomiyasu was called for Japan U16 ahead of the AFC U-16 Championship in Thailand. He made two appearances in the tournament, as Japan U16 were eliminated in the quarter–finals.

In July 2014, Tomiyasu was called up to the Japan U17 for the first time. He participated in a number of matches for the side throughout 2015.

In June 2015, Tomiyasu was called up to the Japan U18 squad for the Panda Cup. He played two times in the tournament, as the U18 side won the trophy, finishing first place. In March 2016, he was called up to the Japan U-19 squad for the first time. Six months later, he was ahead of the AFC U-19 Championship in Bahrain. He played his first match of the tournament, where he helped the U19 side win 3–0 against Yemen U19. Tomiyasu scored his first goal of the tournament, in a 3–0 win against Qatar U19 on 20 October 2016. He helped the Japan U19 reached the final after beating Vietnam in the semi–final. Tomiyasu started in the final against Saudi Arabia U19 and played 120 minutes; which resulting Japan U19 won 5–3 on penalties. During the AFC U-19 Championship tournament, he helped the Japan U19 side keep all six clean sheets.

In May 2017, Tomiyasu was elected Japan U-20 national team for 2017 U-20 World Cup in South Korea. He made his Japan U20 debut, starting the whole game, in a 3–2 win against Honduras U-20 in a friendly match. At this tournament, he played full time in all 4 matches as centre back, as the U-20 side were eliminated in the quarter–finals.

In May 2018, Tomiyasu was called up to the Japan U21 for the first time ahead of the Toulon Tournament. He went on to make four appearances for the side, as they were eliminated in the Group Stage.

In June 2021, Tomiyasu was named in the Japan squad for his first Olympic tournament, this time on home soil. He previously expressed his interest in playing at the tournament. Prior to the start of the Olympics, Tomiyasu was featured three out of the four friendly matches for the national side. Along the way, he suffered ankle injury, but it did not affect his chances to be in the Olympics squad. Tomiyasu made his debut in the tournament against France Olympic team on 28 July 2021 and started the whole game to help Japan win 4–0. He made two more appearances for the Olympics team, including a 2–0 loss against Mexico Olympic team in the bronze medal match.

Senior

On 30 August 2018, Tomiyasu received his first international call-up from the Japan national team for the Kirin Challenge Cup 2018. It was not until 12 October 2018 when he made his Japan debut, starting the whole game, in a 3–0 win against Panama. Tomiyasu became the first teenager to start in the senior team since Ryo Miyaichi. A month later on 16 November 2018, he made his second appearance for the national side, in a 1–1 draw against Venezuela.

In December 2018, Tomiyasu was re-called to the Japanese squad for the 2019 AFC Asian Cup. He made his tournament debut for the national side, starting the whole game and helped Japan win 3–2 against Turkmenistan. He helped Japan keep a clean sheet by beating Oman 1–0 win to advance to the knockout stage. He then scored his first goal for the national side, scoring from a header, in a 1–0 win against Saudi Arabia to reach the semi–finals. Tomiyasu later played two more matches of the tournament, which saw the national side reaching the final for the first time since 2011. In the AFC Asian Cup final against Qatar, he started and captained the side, as they lost 3–1, finishing as runner–up in the process.

Following the conclusion to the AFC Asian Cup tournament, Tomiyasu was called up to the squad ahead of the Copa América in Brazil. He started all three matches, playing in the centre–back position, as they were eliminated in the Group Stage. He later played three matches of 2019, helping the national side keep three clean sheets.

Almost a year absent, Tomiyasu was called up to the Japan squad on 6 October 2020. He started three out of the four matches for the national team by the end of the year. 

In November 2022, Tomiyasu was called up to the 26-man Japan squad that would compete in Qatar for the 2022 FIFA World Cup.

Style of play
Playing in either the right–back or centre–back positions, Tomiyasu is known for being physical, as well as his strong defending structure.

His performance at Sint-Truiden was so impressive that Voetbal Nieuws named him "The Best Eleven of Foreign Players Who Have Left from the Jupiler League". Former teammate Pol García praised Tomiyasu for his attitude, while former Italy international defender Cristian Zaccardo praised his strong and energetic performances. Bologna's technical coach Emilio De Leo said about Tomiyasu's performances, saying: "He has the ability to read and manipulate time and space in a modern way." The club manager Marco Di Vaio agreed, saying: "Tomiyasu immediately impressed us because he is very good with his feet and knows how to adapt to all defense roles." National Italian newspaper Corriere dello Sport praised Tomiyasu's performance, saying: "He is a treasure. The key to reinforcing Bologna".

Manuel Minguzzi, a reporter for Tuttobologna, said about his performance: "Fans can always expect maximum professionalism and commitment from Tomiyasu. As a full back he did very well, while as a central he made some mistakes, but in Serie A it is quite normal because adaptation is needed. Tomiyasu also possesses great qualities when building the game. I was very struck by the fact that in the first year of Serie A he immediately became the protagonist. He had been taken as a central-defender but was often used as full-back offering both phases of play. As soon as he arrived he became an idol. The Japanese market is always very active on social networks and Bologna has expanded its popularity thanks to Tomiyasu." Former Japan manager Alberto Zaccheroni praised manager Siniša Mihajlović for using Tomiyasu regularly in the first team, saying: "He was good but not malicious, Mihajlovic did a great job making him play a full-back year, in less risky areas, and then use him as a central player after gaining experience."

Media
Tomiyasu was involved in the Amazon Original sports docuseries All or Nothing: Arsenal, which documented the club by spending time with the coaching staff and players behind the scenes both on and off the field throughout their 2021–22 season.

Personal life
Tomiyasu has two sisters. He was planning to follow in his sisters' footsteps by becoming a professional swimmer before switching to football instead, stating that he wanted to be a footballer. In his first press conference in Bologna, Tomiyasu said he began to learn Italian and asked the media to call him Tomi. By February 2020, Italian media Corriere Di Bologna reported that Tomiyasu already spoke Italian. In addition to Italian and his native Japanese, Tomiyasu also speaks English, having sharpened his English skills during his spell in Sint-Truiden.

Tomiyasu revealed that growing up, he idolised Javier Mascherano. In the wake of the COVID-19 pandemic in Italy, Tomiyasu spoke out about his life during the pandemic and while the season was suspended, he exercised daily. On 12 May 2020, his former club, Avispa Fukuoka expressed their gratitude to Tomiyasu after he donated 1,000 masks to the club's academy. The following month, Bologna revealed that the players and staff members agreed to give up a month's salary.

Career statistics

Club

International

Scores and results list Japan's goal tally first, score column indicates score after each Tomiyasu goal.

Honours
Japan U-19
AFC U-19 Championship: 2016

Japan
AFC Asian Cup: runner-up 2019

Individual
IFFHS AFC Man Team of the Year: 2020
IFFHS AFC Men's Team of the Decade 2011–2020
Japan Pro-Footballers Association awards: Best XI (2022)

References

External links

Profile at the Arsenal F.C. website
Profile at the Premier League website

1998 births
Living people
Association football people from Fukuoka Prefecture
Association football defenders
Japanese footballers
Japan youth international footballers
Avispa Fukuoka players
Sint-Truidense V.V. players
Bologna F.C. 1909 players
Arsenal F.C. players
J1 League players
J2 League players
Belgian Pro League players
Serie A players
Japanese expatriate footballers
Expatriate footballers in Belgium
Japanese expatriate sportspeople in Belgium
Expatriate footballers in Italy
Japanese expatriate sportspeople in Italy
2019 AFC Asian Cup players
2019 Copa América players
2022 FIFA World Cup players
Japan international footballers
Footballers at the 2020 Summer Olympics
Olympic footballers of Japan
Premier League players